Anoxic waters are areas of sea water, fresh water, or groundwater that are depleted of dissolved oxygen.  The US Geological Survey defines anoxic groundwater as those with dissolved oxygen concentration of less than 0.5 milligrams per litre. Anoxic waters can be contrasted with hypoxic waters, which are low (but not lacking) in dissolved oxygen.  This condition is generally found in areas that have restricted water exchange.

In most cases, oxygen is prevented from reaching the deeper levels by a physical barrier, as well as by a pronounced density stratification, in which, for instance, heavier hypersaline waters rest at the bottom of a basin.  Anoxic conditions will occur if the rate of oxidation of organic matter by bacteria is greater than the supply of dissolved oxygen.

Anoxic waters are a natural phenomenon, and have occurred throughout geological history. The Permian–Triassic extinction event, a mass extinction of species from the world's oceans, may have resulted from widespread anoxic conditions combined with ocean acidification driven by a massive release of carbon dioxide into Earth's atmosphere.  Many lakes have a permanent or temporary anoxic layer created by respiration depleting oxygen at depth and thermal stratification preventing its resupply.

Anoxic basins exist in the Baltic Sea, the Black Sea, the Cariaco Trench, various fjord valleys, and elsewhere. Eutrophication has likely increased the extent of anoxic zones in areas including the Baltic Sea, the Gulf of Mexico, and Hood Canal in Washington State.

Causes and effects
Anoxic conditions result from a combination of environmental conditions including density stratification, inputs of organic material or other reducing agents, and physical barriers to water circulation.  In fjords, shallow sills at the entrance may prevent circulation, while at continental boundaries, circulation may be especially low while organic material input from production at upper levels is exceptionally high. In wastewater treatment, the absence of oxygen alone is indicated anoxic while the term anaerobic is used to indicate the absence of any common electron acceptor such as nitrate, sulfate or oxygen.

When oxygen is depleted in a basin, bacteria first turn to the second-best electron acceptor, which in sea water, is nitrate. Denitrification occurs, and the nitrate will be consumed rather rapidly. After reducing some other minor elements, the bacteria will turn to reducing sulfate. This results in the byproduct of hydrogen sulfide (H2S), a chemical toxic to most biota and responsible for the characteristic "rotten egg" smell and dark black sediment color:

2 CH2O +  → 2  + H2S + chemical energy

These sulfides will mostly be oxidized to either sulfates (~90%) in more oxygen-rich water or precipitated and converted into pyrite (~10%), according to the following chemical equations:

Some chemolithotrophs can also facilitate the oxidation of hydrogen sulfide into elemental sulfur, according to the following chemical equation:

H2S + O2 → S + H2O2

Anoxia is quite common in muddy ocean bottoms where there are both high amounts of organic matter and low levels of inflow of oxygenated water through the sediment.  Below a few centimeters from the surface the interstitial water (water between sediment) is oxygen free.

Anoxia is further influenced by biochemical oxygen demand (BOD), which is the amount of oxygen used by marine organisms in the process of breaking down organic matter.  BOD is influenced by the type of organisms present, the pH of the water, temperature, and the type of organic matter present in the area.  BOD is directly related to the amount of dissolved oxygen available, especially in smaller bodies of water such as rivers and streams.  As BOD increases, available oxygen decreases.  This causes stress on larger organisms.  BOD comes from natural and anthropogenic sources, including: dead organisms, manure, wastewater, and urban runoff.

Human caused anoxic conditions

Eutrophication, an influx of nutrients (phosphate/nitrate), often a byproduct of agricultural run-off and sewage discharge, can result in large but short-lived algae blooms. Upon a bloom's conclusion, the dead algae sink to the bottom and are broken down until all oxygen is expended.  Such a case is the Gulf of Mexico where a seasonal dead zone occurs, which can be disturbed by weather patterns such as hurricanes and tropical convection.  Sewage discharge, specifically that of nutrient concentrated "sludge", can be especially damaging to ecosystem diversity.  Species sensitive to anoxic conditions are replaced by fewer hardier species, reducing the overall variability of the affected area.

Gradual environmental changes through eutrophication or global warming can cause major oxic-anoxic regime shifts. Based on model studies this can occur abruptly, with a transition between an oxic state dominated by cyanobacteria, and an anoxic state with sulfate-reducing bacteria and phototrophic sulfur bacteria.

Daily and seasonal cycles
The temperature of a body of water directly affects the amount of dissolved oxygen it can hold.  Following Henry's law, as water becomes warmer, oxygen becomes less soluble in it.  This property leads to daily anoxic cycles on small geographic scales and seasonal cycles of anoxia on larger scales.  Thus, bodies of water are more vulnerable to anoxic conditions during the warmest period of the day and during summer months.  This problem can be further exacerbated in the vicinity of industrial discharge where warm water used to cool machinery is less able to hold oxygen than the basin to which it is released.

Daily cycles are also influenced by the activity of photosynthetic organisms.  The lack of photosynthesis during nighttime hours in the absence of light can result in anoxic conditions intensifying throughout the night with a maximum shortly after sunrise.

Biological adaptation

Individual species’ reactions to eutrophication can vary widely. For example, some organisms, such as primary producers, can adapt very quickly and even thrive under anoxic conditions. However, most organisms are extremely susceptible to slight changes in aquatic oxygen levels. Simply put - if a respirating organism is presented with little to no oxygen, its chances of survival will decrease. Therefore, eutrophication and anoxic conditions in water leads to a decrease in biodiversity.

For example, the soft coral Xenia umbellata can resist some anoxic conditions for short periods of time, but after about 3 weeks, mean survival decreases to about 81% and about 40% of surviving species experience size reductions, lessening in coloration, and compromised pinnate structures (Simancas-Giraldo et al., 2021). Another example of a susceptible organism is observed with The Sydney Cockle, Anadara trapezia. Enriched sediments have lethal and sublethal effects on this Cockle and, as stated in [Vadillo Gonzalez et al., 2021], “movement of cockles was reduced in enriched sediments compared to natural treatments.” These are just a few examples of the hundreds of thousands of aquatic species that exist, but these and other examples show important results.

A study collecting over 850 published experiments "reporting oxygen thresholds and/or lethal times for a total of 206 species spanning the full taxonomic range of benthic metazoans."

Individual species will have different adaptive responses to anoxic conditions based on their biological makeup and the condition of their habitat. While some are able to pump oxygen from higher water levels down into the sediment, other adaptations include specific hemoglobins for low oxygen environments, slow movement to reduce rate of metabolism, and symbiotic relationships with anaerobic bacteria. In all cases, the prevalence of excess nutrients results in low levels of biologic activity and a lower level of species diversity if the area is not normally anoxic.

Anoxic basins
 Bannock Basin in Levantine Sea, eastern Mediterranean Sea;
 Black Sea Basin, off eastern Europe, below 50 metres (150 feet);
 Caspian Sea Basin, below 100 metres (300 feet);
 Cariaco Basin, off north central Venezuela;
 Gotland Deep, in the Baltic off Sweden;
 L'Atalante basin, eastern Mediterranean Sea
 Mariager Fjord, off Denmark;
 Orca Basin, northeast Gulf of Mexico;
 Saanich Inlet, off Vancouver Island, Canada;

See also
 Anoxic event
 Dead zone (ecology)
 Hypoxia (environmental)
 Meromictic
 Mortichnia
 Ocean deoxygenation
Oxygen minimum zones

References

 
 Hallberg, R.O. (1974) "Paleoredox conditions in the Eastern Gotland Basin during the recent centuries". Merentutkimuslait. Julk./Havsforskningsinstitutets Skrift, 238: 3-16.
 
 Fenchel, Tom & Finlay, Bland J. (1995) Ecology and Evolution in Anoxic Worlds (Oxford Series in Ecology and Evolution) Oxford University Press. 
 Richards, F.A. (1965) "Anoxic basins and fjords", in Riley, J.P., and Skirrow, G. (eds) Chemical Oceanography, London, Academic Press, 611-643. 
 
 Sarmiento, J.A. et al. (1988-B) "Ocean Carbon-Cycle Dynamics and Atmospheric pCO2". Philosophical Transactions of the Royal Society of London, Series A, Mathematical and Physical Sciences, Vol. 325, No. 1583, Tracers in the Ocean (May 25, 1988), pp. 3–21.
 .
 
 
 
 

 
Chemical oceanography
Aquatic ecology